Ed Sayles is the producing director emeritus of the Merry-Go-Round Playhouse and Finger Lakes Musical Theatre Festival.

Early years
Sayles was born in Syracuse, New York on February 19, 1952.  After graduating with a BA from SUNY College at Cortland, he went on to earn an MA in Directing from Bowling Green State University in Ohio.

Career
After receiving his graduate degree, Sayles served as artistic director for a small theatre in Dayton, Ohio.  While there, he helped create two new theater spaces:  a 300-seat thrust space for the Trotwood Circle Theatre and a 250-seat experimental space for the First Street Theatre.  In the fall of 1980, Sayles was asked to take over the Merry-Go-Round Playhouse for the retiring founder, Susan Riford.  According to Merry-Go-Round Business Manager Lynnette Lee, the operating budget for Merry-Go-Round has grown from $180,000 to $5 million under Sayles' leadership.  Attendance at the Playhouse's Musical Theatre season has grown from 9,000 to 50,000, and the number of students attending Youth Theatre performances has grown from 10,000 to over 125,000.

Sayles has overseen two major renovations at the Merry-Go-Round Playhouse.  The first, in 1993, was an expansion from 325 seats to 365, and the addition of new dressing rooms and backstage facilities.  In 2004, a $2.5 million renovation was completed, which included a full fly-system and orchestra pit, larger wing space, an expanded box office, new heating and cooling systems, and state-of-the-art lighting and sound systems.  Most importantly of all, the renovation expanded the Playhouse seating from 365 to a Broadway-size house of 501 seats.  This would eventually enable Merry-Go-Round to earn the nickname of "Broadway in the Finger Lakes".

One of Sayles' most recent contributions to both the Merry-Go-Round and the city of Auburn was the idea for the Finger Lakes Musical Theatre Festival.  The Festival, which celebrated its inauguration in the summer of 2012, consisted of 6 mainstages productions at the Merry-Go-Round Playhouse; 3 "Off-Broadway"-style shows at the Merry-Go-Round Downtown, held in the Auburn Public Theater; and 20 new musical works held through a series called The PiTCH.  The idea for The PiTCH was actually conceived while Sayles was still in his youth.  In an interview with Emerging Musical Theatre, Sayles explains the origins of The PiTCH:
I’ve always loved the movie Yankee Doodle Day with James Cagney as George M. Cohan. In the movie, Cohan and his partner Sam Harris meet with a producer, and Harris sits at the piano while Cohan “pitches” their story for a show in less than 15 minutes. Pitch. The idea stuck with me for a while. Over the years I’ve become disturbed at the production costs creative teams incur in the early stages of developing their musicals. So The PITCH came into being as a way for creative teams to receive feedback about their work without any out-of-pocket expenses. This summer, The PITCH will be hosting 20 new musicals, which we hope will give them a start on the way to being fully realized productions. I suspect that a number of wonderful ideas for shows have never reached fruition because of the financial burdens that accompany the development process. It is my wish that, in a small way, this will remedy that problem.

Sayles also directs on a regular basis, enjoying everything from large-scale musicals to small touring shows.  He has directed over 125 plays during his tenure at Merry-Go-Round, with favorites including Crazy for You, Camelot, 1776, Oklahoma!, and Big River.

Personal life
Sayles lives in Auburn, New York, close to the Merry-Go-Round Playhouse, with his wife.  He has three grown children.

Honors
He has served two terms on the Theatre Panel of the New York State Council on the Arts.  He has also been a member of the board of directors of the Cayuga Museum, the Cayuga County United Way, and the Cayuga County Office of Tourism.  In 2006, the Cayuga County Legislature declared Friday, May 5, of that year to be "Ed Sayles Day" in recognition of his work as producing director for the Merry-Go-Round Playhouse, which "has become nationally recognized for the quality of both its musical and youth theatres," offering 10 different school productions each year in its curriculum-based in-school workshop and performance program, serving over 125,000 students in 70 school districts across New York State.  Sayles was honored at the 28th Annual Theatre Educators' Conference in September 2012 with the Regional Award for Contributions to Educational & Regional Theatre.

References

1952 births
Living people
American musical theatre directors
Bowling Green State University alumni